Tristan Ingram (born 25 March 1980, Gillingham, Kent, England) is an English House DJ and EDM music producer & remixer from Kent, England.

Career
Tristan is a DJ, producer and remixer his work has been played on mainstream stations such as BBC Radio 1, he has been awarded Judge Jules' 'Tried & Tested' track of the week as well as being featured as a DJ on route and voted the winner of Pete Tong's 'Bedroom Bedlam competition' (leading to it being signed up by Toolroom records) and had the track included on Carl Cox's Space Ibiza 2009 compilation release. He was also awarded mix of the week by Mixmag, as well as being referred to by Mixmag, in summer 2009, as "One to Watch" and was rated by Claudia Cazacu as best breakthrough DJ/producer of 2010.

He mostly works in the UK but during the summer months he can be found DJing in Ibiza. He has close links to DJ Judge Jules and his Judgement Sundays night. He has also played a set at Eden night club in San Antonio where he has held a residency for a number of years. He is also a regular DJ at Random held at HUSH in San Antonio as well as previously playing sets at Ibiza clubs such as: Privilege, Amnesia, Space, El Divino and Sankeys. He has also reported on music events and happenings for Trackitdown website.

In 2019, he released a single with Ali Wilson, Matt Smallwood called "Perfect Sunrise 2019" under the label Toolroom Records.

Discography
Las Salinas – San Antoni (Ali Wilson & Tristan Ingram remix) Vandit
Hannah – When The Sun Goes Down (Ali Wilson & Tristan Ingram remix)
Tristan Ingram – More
Hannah – Sanity (Ali Wilson & Tristan Ingram remix)
Tristan Ingram & Grant Nalder – Uppers & Downers – Polarbear Music
Hannah – I Believe in You – Ali Wilson & Tristan Ingram remix
Ali Wilson Matt Smallwood & Tristan Ingram – Miasma – Pilot 6
Ali Wilson & Tristan Ingram – African Chant – Blackhole
Mr Sam & Andy Duguid – Satisfaction Guaranteed BK/Black Russian & Tristan Ingram remix – Blackhole Recordings
Florence & The Machine – Howl (Ali Wilson & Tristan Ingram Club Edit)
X Cabs – Neuro 99 (Black Russian & Tristan Ingram 10 years on remix) Hook Records
Black Russian & Tristan Ingram – Take Note (Fakt) – Original mix
Wilson, Smallwood & Ingram – Koko – Armada
La Roux – In for the Kill – Tristan Ingram & Black Russian Festival edit
Ulysses & Ingram – Come on Baby
Black Russian & Tristan Ingram – Take Note (Fakt) (Tech Trance mix)
Lazy Rich – Ghosts – Black Russian & Tristan Ingram remix (Plasmapool)
Wilson, Smallwood & Ingram – Perfect Sunrise (Toolroom Records)
Tristan Ingram & Black Russian – Come and Get it (Fakt)
Rob Cockerton & Jason Still – Loaded – Tristan Ingram mix (White)
Ruff Driverz Feat Arrola – Dreaming – (Tristan Ingram, Rob Cockerton & Jason Still mix)
Degrees in Motion Shine On – Tristan Ingram & Jason Still 2008 Rerub (Cayenne)
Patrik Carrera – Drowning – Tristan Ingram & Jason Still 2am mix (Couture)
Andrew Galea & Tristan Ingram – Class of 87
DJ Fresh – Louder (Andrew Galea & Tristan Ingram NYE remix)
Chase & Status – Time (Tristan Ingram & Andrew Galea Ibiza remix)
Andrew Galea & Tristan Ingram – Disco Dance

References

External links 
 
 JudgementSundays.co.uk
 Beatport
 Discogs Release Discography

Living people
Club DJs
British radio DJs
English DJs
British dance musicians
English house musicians
Place of birth missing (living people)
1982 births